La Tirana is a 1794 oil on canvas portrait by Francisco de Goya. It was last recorded in the March collection in Palma de Mallorca in 2001.

It is the second of two portraits he produced of the actress María del Rosario Fernández, known as 'La Tirana' after her actor husband Francisco Castellanos, who was nicknamed el Tirano. The other is in the Real Academia de Bellas Artes de San Fernando.

See also
List of works by Francisco Goya

Bibliography (in Spanish)
 Glendinning, Nigel (1992). Central Hispano, ed. Goya. La década de los Caprichos. pp. 148-149. .
 Gómez García, Manuel (1998). Diccionario Akal de Teatro. Ediciones Akal. .
 Huerta, Javier; Peral, Emilio; Urzaiz, Héctor (2005). Espasa-Calpe, ed. Teatro español de la A a la Z.'' Madrid. .

External links

1794 paintings
Portraits by Francisco Goya
Paintings in the collection of the Real Academia de Bellas Artes de San Fernando